Grant Muller (born 16 July 1970) is a South African professional golfer who plays on the Sunshine Tour.

Muller was born in Johannesburg. He turned professional in 1991 and joined the Sunshine Tour the same year. He has won twice on the Sunshine Tour, with the first win coming in 1997 at the Vodacom Series: Kwazulu-Natal and the second in 2010 at the Lombard Insurance Classic. He has finished in the top-25 of the Sunshine Tour's Order of Merit four times (2000/01, 2001/02, 2004/05, 2010), with his best finish coming in 2001/02 when he finished in tenth.

Professional wins (5)

Sunshine Tour wins (2)

Sunshine Tour playoff record (1–1)

Other wins (3)
2002 3 wins (Diners Club Tour)

Results in major championships

Note: Muller only played in The Open Championship.
CUT = missed the half-way cut

External links

South African male golfers
Sunshine Tour golfers
Golfers from Johannesburg
1970 births
Living people